Creosol is a chemical compound with the molecular formula C8H10O2.  It is one of the components of creosote. Compared with phenol, creosol is a less toxic disinfectant.

Sources 
Sources of creosol include:
 Coal tar creosote
 Wood creosote
 Reduction product of vanillin using zinc powder in strong hydrochloric acid (Clemmensen reduction)
 Found as glycosides in green vanilla beans
 It is also found in tequila.

Reactions
Creosol reacts with hydrogen halides to give a catechol.

See also
 Vanillin, a related phenol

References

External links

Antiseptics
Phenol ethers
Alkylphenols